The Perelman Performing Arts Center, known during construction as the Ronald O. Perelman Performing Arts Center at the World Trade Center (PACWTC), is a multi-space performing arts center under construction at the northeast corner of the World Trade Center complex in Manhattan, New York City. The Performing Arts Center is located at the intersection of Vesey, Fulton, and Greenwich Streets in Lower Manhattan. The building is named for billionaire Ronald Perelman, who donated $75 million to its construction.

Plans for the Performing Arts Center were first announced by the Lower Manhattan Development Corporation (LMDC) in 2004 as part of the rebuilding of the World Trade Center site after the September 11 attacks. Gehry Partners LLP and Snøhetta were selected as the original designers, but plans were reportedly stalled over financing and design, as well as the presence of the temporary entrance to the PATH train's World Trade Center station on the site.

The original design was scrapped by September 2014, and Joshua Ramus and Davis Brody Bond were selected as architects the next year. After further financing issues were resolved and the PATH station entrance was relocated, below-ground construction began in August 2017, followed by the construction of the above-ground frame in 2020. It is scheduled to be completed and open in September 2023.

Original design

The Lower Manhattan Development Corporation (LMDC) announced on October 12, 2004, that Gehry Partners LLP and Snøhetta, an architectural firm from Norway, would design the Performing Arts Center. Gehry's proposal, which incorporated a boxlike design, would have housed the Joyce Theater, as the Signature Theater Company had dropped out due to space constraints and cost limitations.

Plans for the construction of the Performing Arts Center were reportedly stalled over financing and design, although construction was also hindered by the presence of the entrance to the PATH train's temporary World Trade Center station within its footprint.

In February 2014, David Lan, artistic director of London's Young Vic Theatre, was announced as consulting artistic director of the PACWTC, a position he will hold simultaneously with his Young Vic leadership. The venue's mission was revised to originate works of theater, music, and dance in three small flexible theaters.

Redesign

By September 2014, Gehry Associates were no longer connected with the project. Plans were proceeding for the choice of a new architect and future programming for a 2019 opening. Gehry's design was scrapped; the board of the Performing Arts Center planned to choose a new design from one of three other architects. This change came after Maggie Boepple, the president of the Performing Arts Center appointed in 2012, was said to have disapproved of Gehry's work.

In July 2015, it was reported that the construction budget for the Performing Arts Center was to be reduced from $350 million to $200 million. The Lower Manhattan Development Corporation (LMDC) announced at a board meeting that the $99 million in federal funds committed to the project was contingent on the arts center's leaders’ "producing an affordable design and a viable plan for raising the remaining money from private sources." In November 2015, the Performing Arts Center announced that they had awarded the design architect contract to Joshua Ramus of REX, with the firm Davis Brody Bond to serve as executive architect.

On March 3, 2016, the permanent PATH station building opened one block to the south, and the temporary entrance was closed. The opening of the new station building allowed the temporary station entrance to be demolished in August of that year. This, in turn, allowed the construction of the Performing Arts Center on the site.

On June 29, 2016, billionaire Ronald Perelman donated $75 million to the construction and endowment of the Performing Arts Center at the World Trade Center. Because of his contribution to the facility, the center was renamed after him. In September 2016, Barbra Streisand was named the center's chairwoman of the board. The concept art for the new building was revealed that month, with mostly positive reviews from architecture critics. On March 27, 2017, it was announced that construction would be delayed due to ongoing disputes between the Lower Manhattan Development Corporation (LMDC) and the Port Authority regarding funding for the project.

Construction 

Construction began in August 2017 on its below-grade parking garage, which will be accessible from the rear of the building on Vesey Street. Work on the building itself was originally expected to begin in 2018, with an estimated 2020 completion date and opening. The Port Authority gave the Performing Arts Center a 99-year lease in February 2018. The first pieces of structural steel arrived that April. Work was halted in early 2018 due to financial disagreements between the Port Authority and LMDC, but routine steel work and concrete pouring resumed shortly thereafter. The Performing Arts Center received $89 million from the LMDC and the United States Department of Housing and Urban Development in December 2018.

Underground work was completed in July 2019, and steel construction began later that year. At the time, the Performing Arts Center was scheduled to open in 2021. The building topped out on September 11, 2020, the 19th anniversary of the September 11 attacks. As of March 2023, the Performing Arts Center is scheduled to open in September 2023.

Design 
The public floor will be located at street level, and will house a restaurant/bar to provide refreshments during show intermissions. The second floor will consist of rehearsal and dressing rooms for theater actors, and the third floor will house three theaters. All three theaters are designed so that the walls will be able to rotate and expand to provide extra space for a single theater if needed. The theaters will hold approximately 1,200 people combined. The structural engineers on the project include Magnusson Klemencic Associates and Robert Silman Associates; the MEP, fire protection, IT and security engineer is Jaros, Baum & Bolles; and the construction manager is Sciame Construction, LLC. Other key contributors to the project team include David Rockwell's Rockwell Group, architect of the restaurant and lobby interiors; Charcoalblue, theater designer; and Tillotson Design Associates, architectural lighting designer.

The Performing Arts Center has received multiple design awards, including the Society of Registered American Architects New York, Special Award for Innovation in Cultural Architecture, 2022; American Institute of Architects New York, Honor Award in Projects, 2022; The Chicago Athenaeum American Architectural Award, 2021; Architizer A+ Awards, Winner in the Unbuilt Cultural Category, 2019.

References

External links

Buildings and structures under construction in the United States
Concert halls in New York City
Opera houses in New York City
Performing arts centers in New York City
World Trade Center